Aröd och Timmervik is a bimunicipal locality situated in Stenungsund Municipality and Kungälv Municipality in Västra Götaland County, Sweden. It had 637 inhabitants in 2010.

References 

Populated places in Västra Götaland County
Populated places in Kungälv Municipality
Populated places in Stenungsund Municipality